"A Child Is Born" is a jazz instrumental that was later recorded with lyrics added. It was written in 1969 by the jazz trumpeter Thad Jones with lyrics added independently by Alec Wilder after hearing the Thad Jones-Mel Lewis Orchestra perform the instrumental. The instrumental and the song have been recorded by a number of musicians including Tony Bennett, Stanley Turrentine and Bill Evans (also released on Christmas with Sinatra & Friends),  Richard Davis, Kenny Burrell, Dee Dee Bridgewater, Hank Jones and Helen Merrill.

Possible contribution of Roland Hanna to A Child Is Born
Jazz historian Mark Stryker, in his book Jazz from Detroit, provides the following account of the writing of "A Child Is Born":

Lyrics
Now, out of the night / New as the dawn
/ Into the light
/ This Child
/ Innocent Child
/ Soft as a fawn
/ This Child is born

One small heart
/ One pair of eyes
/ One work of art
/ Here in my arms
/ Here he lies
/ Trusting and warm
/ Blessed this morn
/ A Child is born

Form
"'A Child Is Born' is a 32 bars long song in 3/4 time, and when soloing over it, jazz musicians "usually omit the last two bars", leaving a "30-bar solo form". The original was recorded in B-flat major. It features a slow, lengthy introduction on the piano, lasting over a minute. Bob Yurochko in his book A Short History of Jazz refers to it as a "beautiful ballad" of mainstream jazz."

References

Songs about children
1969 songs
1960s jazz standards
Songs written by Alec Wilder
Jazz compositions in B-flat major